The seventeenth series of the British television drama series Grange Hill began broadcasting on 4 January 1994, before ending on 11 March 1994 on BBC One. The series follows the lives of the staff and pupils of the eponymous school, an inner-city London comprehensive school. It consists of twenty episodes.

Cast

Pupils

Teachers

Others

Episodes

DVD release
The seventeenth series of Grange Hill has never been released on DVD as of 2014.

Notes

References

1994 British television seasons
Grange Hill